Eijkman is a lunar impact crater that is located on the far side of the Moon's southern hemisphere. It lies about a half crater diameter to the southeast of the larger crater Lemaître. To the south-southwest is the crater Crommelin, and to the northeast is Fizeau.

The rim of this crater is well-defined and has not been significantly worn down by impacts. Nevertheless, there are a few tiny craterlets along the edge and a small craterlet along the northern inner wall. The inner walls display some minor terracing along the northwestern edge. Near the midpoint of the crater interior floor is a horseshoe-shaped central peak formation, with the open end pointing towards the south.

Satellite craters
By convention these features are identified on lunar maps by placing the letter on the side of the crater midpoint that is closest to Eijkman.

References

 
 
 
 
 
 
 
 
 
 
 
 

Impact craters on the Moon